Choke Canyon Reservoir is a reservoir in South Texas, United States.  The lake and the dam that creates it are owned by the United States Bureau of Reclamation and managed by the City of Corpus Christi.

Geography 

Choke Canyon Reservoir is 4 miles (6 km) west of the town of Three Rivers and about 65 miles (105 km) south of the city of San Antonio. It impounds water from the Frio River shortly before the river's confluence with the Nueces River.

Uses

Choke Canyon Reservoir provides drinking water for the city of Corpus Christi. The reservoir also provides good fishing opportunities, especially for largemouth bass and catfish. Choke Canyon State Park, located in two places on the south shore of the lake, provides access to the lake and a number of other recreational activities.

Fish and plant life
Choke Canyon Reservoir has been stocked with species of fish intended to improve the utility of the reservoir for recreational fishing.  Fish present in Choke Canyon Reservoir include alligator gar, white bass, white crappie, catfish, and largemouth bass, sunfish, and bluegill.  Plant life in the lake includes American pondweed, coontail, water stargrass, rushes, cattail, and hydrilla.

It is also the westernmost range of the American Alligator. 

The site hosted a rare bird, a Spotted Rail, in December 2020, attracting hundreds of birdwatchers. The record represents the 3rd record of the species for Texas, and the 4th for the United States.

References

External links 

Texas Parks & Wildlife Department pages for Choke Canyon Reservoir and Choke Canyon State Park
Choke Canyon Reservoir at recreation.gov
USBR page

Choke Canyon
Protected areas of Live Oak County, Texas
Protected areas of McMullen County, Texas
Dams in Texas
United States Bureau of Reclamation dams
Dams completed in 1982
Bodies of water of Live Oak County, Texas
Bodies of water of McMullen County, Texas
1982 establishments in Texas